The transition of church communities to the OCU is the process of transition of parishes, previously affiliated to the Ukrainian Orthodox Church (Moscow Patriarchate) (UOC MP), from that metropolis to the Orthodox Church of Ukraine (OCU). This process began with the Unification Council of 15 December 2018, which resulted in the creation of the Orthodox Church of Ukraine. Between 15 December 2018 and 7 November 2022, 1153 parishes (or about 9.5% of the 12,092 parishes the UOC MP had in December 2018) announced their transition from the UOC MP to the OCU.

In 2022 after the start of Russian invasion of Ukraine about 700 more parishes transferred from the UOC (MP) to the Orthodox Church of Ukraine. In general, in four years after the unification council, almost 1,500 religious communities joined the OCU.

Counts of parish transitions 

There were two periods of transition:
 From the beginning of the Russo-Ukrainian War to the Unification Council, there were transitions from the UOC MP to the Ukrainian Orthodox Church – Kyiv Patriarchate (UOC KP).
 From the Unification Council to date, there were transitions from both the UOC MP and the UOC KP to the UOC.

Prior to the Unification Council, 62 parishes transferred from the UOC MP to the UOC KP. Counts by year: 23 in 2014; 22 in 2015; 5 in 2016, 10 in 2017; 2 in 2018.(uk)
On 10 December 2018, the UOC MP published its annual report stating that it had 12,092 parishes by the end of 2018 (2017: 12,069). 
From 15 December 2018, the transition of UOC MP parishes to the OCU occurred as follows, numerically by month:

See also 
 Religion in Ukraine

References

Sources 
 Explore Ukraine's Contemporary Religious Landscape in MAPA's New Story Map Journal // Harvard Ukrainian Research Institute, 8 February 2020
 Religious pluralism in Ukraine // harvard-cga.maps.arcgis.com

External links 
 Map of Transitions to OCU with UOC MP (moderated by RISU)
 Map Transitions of Parish ROC to OCU (activists)
 Map Transitions to OCU (TSN)
 

 
Ukrainian Orthodox church bodies